Strength in Numbers is the ninth studio album by Swedish metal band The Haunted, released on 25 August 2017 via Century Media.

Track listing

Personnel 
Credits are adapted from the album's liner notes.

The Haunted
 Marco Aro – vocals
 Patrik Jensen – rhythm guitar
 Ola Englund – lead guitar
 Jonas Björler – bass
 Adrian Erlandsson – drums

Production and design
 Russ Russell − production, engineering, mixing, mastering
 Jocke Skog − producer 
 Andreas Pettersson − artwork
 Nilay Pavlovic − photography

References 

2017 albums
The Haunted (Swedish band) albums
Century Media Records albums